John Petter Sando  is a Norwegian handball player.

He made his debut on the Norwegian national team in 1989, 
and played 102 matches for the national team between 1989 and 1995. He participated at the 1993 World Men's Handball Championship.

References

Year of birth missing (living people)
Living people
Norwegian male handball players